The 2022–23 Phoenix Suns season is their 55th season of the franchise in the National Basketball Association (NBA), as well as their 30th season at the Footprint Center. It is also the last season under Robert Sarver's ownership group, as he was suspended from league-wide activities on September 13, 2022 due to an independent investigation on Sarver that began the season prior revealing ugly behaviors he had throughout his tenure as franchise owner of the Suns. He later announced in that same month that minority team owner and vice chairman of the Suns, Sam Garvin, would take over the majority of team duties for the rest of this season until new ownership bought out Sarver as the new majority team owners going forward. Sarver eventually accepted a deal to sell his ownership rights to both the Suns and Phoenix Mercury to an ownership group led by United Wholesale Mortgage CEO Mat Ishbia and his older brother Justin Ishbia for an asking price of $4 billion on December 20, 2022, with the NBA approving of the new ownership on February 6, 2023 and an official announcement confirming the deal coming a day later on February 7, 2023.

During that same period of time, forward Jae Crowder agreed to sit out the rest of the season with the Suns until a potential trade was announced, which occurred on the February 9, 2023 trade deadline. Crowder was ultimately involved in a four-way trade where he got sent to the Milwaukee Bucks while they sent their own assets to the Indiana Pacers and Brooklyn Nets. Nearing the trade deadline of the 2022–23 season, the Suns were involved in a blockbuster transaction, where they traded away Mikal Bridges, Cameron Johnson, four unprotected first round picks, and the right to swap first round picks with the Suns in 2028 to the Brooklyn Nets in exchange for 13-time NBA All-Star and 2-time NBA Finals MVP Kevin Durant and the re-acquisition of T.J. Warren.

The Suns failed to improve upon their 64-18 record from the previous season after a loss to the Cleveland Cavaliers.

Draft

The Suns did not hold any picks in the 2022 NBA draft.

Roster

Standings

Division

Conference

Game log

Preseason

|- style="background:#fcc;"
| 1
| October 2
| Adelaide
| 
| Cameron Payne (23)
| Mikal Bridges (7)
| Chris Paul (12)
| Footprint Center15,152
| 0–1
|- style="background:#cfc;
| 2
| October 5
| @ L.A. Lakers
| 
| Devin Booker (22)
| Deandre Ayton (8)
| Chris Paul (10)
| T-Mobile Arena8,908
| 1–1
|- style="background:#fcc"
| 3
| October 10
| @ Denver
| 
| Devin Booker (20)
| Deandre Ayton (11)
| Chris Paul (8)
| Ball Arena12,505
| 1–2
|- style="background:#fcc;"
| 4
| October 12
| Sacramento
| 
| Duane Washington Jr. (31)
| Bismack Biyombo (12)
| Duane Washington Jr. (4)
| Footprint Center16,085
| 1–3

Regular season

|- style="background:#cfc;"
| 1
| October 19
| Dallas
| 
| Devin Booker (28)
| Mikal Bridges (11)
| Booker, Paul (9)
| Footprint Center17,071
| 1–0
|-style="background:#fcc
| 2
| October 21
| @ Portland
| 
| Devin Booker (33)
| Mikal Bridges (7)
| Chris Paul (12)
| Moda Center19,393
| 1–1
|-style="background:#cfc"
| 3
| October 23
| @ L.A. Clippers
| 
| Devin Booker (35)
| Jock Landale (10)
| Chris Paul (11)
| Crypto.com Arena19,068
| 2–1
|-style="background:#cfc;"
| 4
| October 25
| Golden State
| 
| Devin Booker (34)
| Deandre Ayton (14)
| Chris Paul (9)
| Footprint Center18,055
| 3–1
|- style="background:#cfc;"
| 5
| October 28
| New Orleans
| 
| Mikal Bridges (27)
| Bismack Biyombo (13)
| Chris Paul (9)
| Footprint Center17,071
| 4–1
|- style="background:#cfc;"
| 6
| October 30
| Houston
| 
| Devin Booker (30)
| Landale, Johnson (7)
| Chris Paul (15)
| Footprint Center17,071
| 5–1

|- style="background:#cfc;"
| 7
| November 1
| Minnesota
| 
| Cameron Johnson (29)
| Chris Paul (8)
| Chris Paul (12)
| Footprint Center17,071
| 6–1
|- style="background:#fcc;"
| 8
| November 4
| Portland
| 
| Devin Booker (25)
| Deandre Ayton (8)
| Chris Paul (11)
| Footprint Center17,071
| 6–2
|-style="background:#cfc;"
| 9
| November 5
| Portland
| 
| Devin Booker (24)
| Dario Šarić (9)
| Craig, Landale, Paul (4)
| Footprint Center17,071
| 7–2
|-style="background:#fcc;"
| 10
| November 7
| @ Philadelphia
| 
| Devin Booker (28)
| Ayton, Booker (7)
| Booker, Payne (5)
| Wells Fargo Center20,347
| 7–3
|-style="background:#cfc;"
| 11
| November 9
| @ Minnesota
| 
| Devin Booker (32)
| Mikal Bridges (9)
| Devin Booker (10)
| Target Center16,062
| 8–3
|- style="background:#fcc;"
| 12
| November 11
| @ Orlando
| 
| Cameron Payne (22)
| Devin Booker (8)
| Booker, Bridges (6)
| Amway Center15,879
| 8–4
|- style="background:#fcc;"
| 13
| November 14
| @ Miami
| 
| Devin Booker (25)
| Deandre Ayton (12)
| Booker, Payne (5)
| FTX Arena19,600
| 8–5
|- style="background:#cfc;"
| 14
| November 16
| Golden State
| 
| Cameron Payne (29)
| Torrey Craig (10)
| Booker, Bridges (9)
| Footprint Center17,071
| 9–5
|- style="background:#fcc;"
| 15
| November 18
| @ Utah
| 
| Devin Booker (49)
| Deandre Ayton (10)
| Devin Booker (10)
| Vivint Arena18,206
| 9–6
|- style="background:#cfc;"
| 16
| November 20
| @ New York
| 
| Cameron Payne (21)
| Deandre Ayton (11)
| Cameron Payne (9)
| Footprint Center17,071
| 10–6
|-style="background:#cfc"
| 17
| November 22
| L.A. Lakers
| 
| Booker, Bridges (25)
| Deandre Ayton (15)
| Cameron Payne (7)
| Footprint Center17,071
| 11–6
|-style="background:#cfc"
| 18
| November 25
| Detroit
| 
| Deandre Ayton (28)
| Deandre Ayton (12)
| Cameron Payne (10)
| Footprint Center17,071
| 12–6
|-style="background:#cfc"
| 19
| November 26
| Utah
| 
| Deandre Ayton (29)
| Deandre Ayton (21)
| Devin Booker (7)
| Footprint Center17,071
| 13–6
|-style="background:#cfc"
| 20
| November 28
| @ Sacramento
| 
| Devin Booker (44)
| Deandre Ayton (12)
| Bridges, Payne (7)
| Golden 1 Center16,407
| 14–6
|-style="background:#cfc"
| 21
| November 30
| Chicago
| 
| Devin Booker (51)
| Deandre Ayton (14)
| Booker, Payne (6)
| Footprint Center17,071
| 15–6

|-style="background:#fcc"
| 22
| December 2
| Houston
| 
| Devin Booker (41)
| Mikal Bridges (8)
| Cameron Payne (12)
| Footprint Center17,071
| 15–7
|-style="background:#cfc"
| 23
| December 4
| @ San Antonio
| 
| Deandre Ayton (25)
| Josh Okogie (11)
| Devin Booker (8)
| AT&T Center16,409
| 16–7
|-style="background:#fcc"
| 24
| December 5
| @ Dallas
| 
| Deandre Ayton (20)
| Deandre Ayton (8)
| Cameron Payne (10)
| American Airlines Center20,227
| 16–8
|-style="background:#fcc"
| 25
| December 7
| Boston
| 
| Josh Okogie (28)
| Ayton, Okogie (7)
| Chris Paul (4)
| Footprint Center17,071
| 16–9
|-style="background:#fcc"
| 26
| December 9
| @ New Orleans
| 
| Deandre Ayton (25)
| Deandre Ayton (14)
| Booker, Paul (7)
| Smoothie King Center16,381
| 16–10
|-style="background:#fcc"
| 27
| December 11
| @ New Orleans
| 
| Deandre Ayton (28)
| Deandre Ayton (12)
| Chris Paul (11)
| Smoothie King Center18,681
| 16–11
|-style="background:#fcc"
| 28
| December 13
| @ Houston
| 
| Mikal Bridges (18)
| Torrey Craig (12)
| Chris Paul (7)
| Toyota Center15,128
| 16–12
|-style="background:#cfc"
| 29
| December 15
| @ L.A. Clippers
| 
| Mikal Bridges (27)
| Josh Okogie (11)
| Chris Paul (13)
| Crypto.com Arena15,778
| 17–12
|-style="background:#cfc"
| 30
| December 17
| New Orleans
| 
| Devin Booker (58)
| Biyombo, Booker, Okogie (6)
| Chris Paul (8)
| Footprint Center17,071
| 18–12
|-style="background:#cfc"
| 31
| December 19
| L.A. Lakers
| 
| Chris Paul (28)
| Deandre Ayton (11)
| Chris Paul (8)
| Footprint Center17,071
| 19–12
|-style="background:#fcc"
| 32
| December 20
| Washington
| 
| Landry Shamet (31)
| Deandre Ayton (13)
| Chris Paul (11)
| Footprint Center17,071
| 19–13
|-style="background:#fcc"
| 33
| December 23
| Memphis
| 
| Deandre Ayton (18)
| Ayton, Shamet (5)
| Duane Washington Jr. (5)
| Footprint Center17,071
| 19–14
|-style="background:#fcc"
| 34
| December 25
| @ Denver
| 
| Landry Shamet (31)
| Deandre Ayton (16)
| Chris Paul (16)
| Ball Arena19,642
| 19–15
|-style="background:#cfc"
| 35
| December 27
| @ Memphis
| 
| Duane Washington Jr. (26)
| Deandre Ayton (10)
| Duane Washington Jr. (8)
| FedExForum18,239
| 20–15
|-style="background:#fcc"
| 36
| December 28
| @ Washington
| 
| Deandre Ayton (31)
| Deandre Ayton (7)
| Chris Paul (7)
| Capital One Arena20,476
| 20–16
|-style="background:#fcc"
| 37
| December 30
| @ Toronto
| 
| Mikal Bridges (21)
| Jock Landale (11)
| Chris Paul (12)
| Scotiabank Arena19,800
| 20–17

|-style="background:#fcc"
| 38
| January 2
| @ New York
| 
| Deandre Ayton (12)
| Torrey Craig (7)
| Cameron Payne (7)
| Madison Square Garden19,812
| 20–18
|-style="background:#fcc"
| 39
| January 4
| @ Cleveland
| 
| Chris Paul (25)
| Deandre Ayton (18)
| Chris Paul (8)
| Rocket Mortgage FieldHouse19,432
| 20–19
|-style="background:#fcc"
| 40
| January 6
| Miami
| 
| Deandre Ayton (23)
| Deandre Ayton (14)
| Bridges, Washington Jr. (7)
| Footprint Center17,071
| 20–20
|-style="background:#fcc"
| 41
| January 8
| Cleveland
| 
| Duane Washington Jr. (25)
| Deandre Ayton (11)
| Deandre Ayton (6)
| Footprint Center17,071
| 20–21
|-style="background:#cfc"
| 42
| January 10
| @ Golden State
| 
| Mikal Bridges (26)
| Torrey Craig (14)
| Dario Šarić (7)
| Chase Center18,064
| 21–21
|- style="background:#fcc"
| 43
| January 11
| @ Denver
| 
| Torrey Craig (16)
| Josh Okogie (9)
| Okogie, Washington Jr. (5)
| Ball Arena18,872
| 21–22
|-style="background:#fcc"
| 44
| January 13
| @ Minnesota
| 
| Damion Lee (31)
| Deandre Ayton (11)
| Mikal Bridges (6)
| Target Center16,460
| 21–23
|-style="background:#fcc"
| 45
| January 16
| @ Memphis
| 
| Mikal Bridges (21)
| Dario Šarić (7)
| Damion Lee (9)
| FedExForum17,794
| 21–24
|-style="background:#cfc"
| 46
| January 19
| Brooklyn
|  
| Mikal Bridges (28)
| Deandre Ayton (14)
| Mikal Bridges (9)
| Footprint Center17,071
| 22–24
|-style="background:#cfc"
| 47
| January 21
| Indiana
|  
| Josh Okogie (24)
| Bismack Biyombo (16)
| Bridges, S. Lee, Okogie, Washington Jr. (4)
| Footprint Center17,071
| 23–24
|-style="background:#cfc"
| 48
| January 22
| Memphis
|  
| Mikal Bridges (24)
| Dario Šarić (8)
| Chris Paul (11)
| Footprint Center17,071
| 24–24
|-style="background:#cfc"
| 49
| January 24
| Charlotte
|  
| Cameron Johnson (24)
| Biyombo, Craig (9)
| Chris Paul (11)
| Footprint Center17,071
| 25–24
|-style="background:#fcc"
| 50
| January 26
| Dallas
|  
| Johnson, Paul (22)
| Deandre Ayton (20)
| Chris Paul (10)
| Footprint Center 17,071
| 25–25
|-style="background:#cfc"
| 51
| January 28
| @ San Antonio
|  
| Mikal Bridges (25)
| Dario Šarić (13)
| Chris Paul (11)
| AT&T Center18,354
| 26–25
|-style="background:#cfc"
| 52
| January 30
| Toronto
|  
| Mikal Bridges (29)
| Deandre Ayton (13)
| Chris Paul (9)
| Footprint Center17,071
| 27–25
|-

|-style="background:#fcc"
| 53
| February 1
| Atlanta
|  
| Mikal Bridges (23)
| Deandre Ayton (9)
| Mikal Bridges (7)
| Footprint Center17,071
| 27–26
|-style="background:#cfc"
| 54
| February 3
| @ Boston
|  
| Mikal Bridges (25)
| Dario Šarić (13)
| Chris Paul (8)
| TD Garden19,156
| 28–26
|-style="background:#cfc"
| 55
| February 4
| @ Detroit
| 
| Deandre Ayton (31)
| Deandre Ayton (16)
| Chris Paul (14)
| Little Caesars Arena19,788 
| 29–26
|-style="background:#cfc"
| 56
| February 7
| @ Brooklyn
| 
| Deandre Ayton (35)
| Deandre Ayton (15)
| Chris Paul (12)
| Barclays Center17,093
| 30–26
|-style="background:#fcc"
| 57
| February 9
| @ Atlanta
| 
| Josh Okogie (25)
| Craig, Paul (5)
| Chris Paul (8)
| State Farm Arena17,003
| 30–27
|-style="background:#cfc"
| 58
| February 10
| @ Indiana
| 
| Deandre Ayton (22)
| Torrey Craig (12)
| Chris Paul (9)
| Gainbridge Fieldhouse16,522
| 31–27
|-style="background:#cfc;"
| 59
| February 14
| Sacramento
| 
| Devin Booker (32)
| Deandre Ayton (11)
| Chris Paul (19)
| Footprint Center17,071
| 32–27
|-style="background:#fcc;"
| 60
| February 16
| L.A. Clippers
| 
| Josh Okogie (24)
| Ayton, Craig (6)
| Chris Paul (11)
| Footprint Center17,071
| 32–28
|-style="background:#cfc;"
| 61
| February 24
| Oklahoma City
| 
| Devin Booker (25)
| Deandre Ayton (11)
| Devin Booker (8)
| Footprint Center17,071
| 33–28
|-style="background:#fcc;"
| 62
| February 26
| @ Milwaukee
| 
| Devin Booker (24)
| Deandre Ayton (11)
| Devin Booker (8)
| Fiserv Forum17,636
| 33–29
|-

|-style="background:#cfc;"
| 63
| March 1
| @ Charlotte
| 
| Devin Booker (37)
| Deandre Ayton (16)
| Chris Paul (11)
| Spectrum Center19,137
| 34–29
|-style="background:#cfc;"
| 64
| March 3
| @ Chicago
| 
| Devin Booker (35)
| Kevin Durant (9)
| Chris Paul (10)
| United Center21,169
| 35–29
|-style="background:#cfc;"
| 65
| March 5
| @ Dallas
| 
| Kevin Durant (37)
| Deandre Ayton (16)
| Devin Booker (10)
| American Airlines Center20,311
| 36–29
|-style="background:#cfc;"
| 66
| March 8
| Oklahoma City
| 
| Devin Booker (44)
| Ayton, Wainright (8)
| Chris Paul (9)
| Footprint Center17,071
| 37–29
|-style="background:#fcc;"
| 67
| March 11
| Sacramento
| 
| Devin Booker (28)
| Deandre Ayton (12)
| Chris Paul (16)
| Footprint Center17,071
| 37–30
|-style="background:#fcc;" 
| 68
| March 13
| @ Golden State
|  
| Devin Booker (32)
| Deandre Ayton (12)
| Chris Paul (11)
| Chase Center18,064 
| 37–31
|- style="background:#fcc;"
| 69
| March 14
| Milwaukee
|  
| Devin Booker (30) 
| Deandre Ayton (8) 
| Chris Paul (8)
| Footprint Center17,071 
| 37–32
|- style="background:#cfc;"
| 70
| March 16
| Orlando
|   
| Devin Booker (19) 
| Deandre Ayton (7) 
| Chris Paul (7) 
| Footprint Center17,071
| 38–32
|- style="background:#fcc;"
| 71
| March 19
| @ Oklahoma City
|    
| Devin Booker (46)
| Torrey Craig (7) 
| Chris Paul (13) 
| Paycom Center17,897
| 38–33
|-
| 72
| March 22
| @ LA Lakers
|  
|  
|  
|  
| Crypto.com Arena 
| 
|-
| 73
| March 24
| @ Sacramento
|  
|  
|  
|  
| Golden 1 Center 
| 
|-
| 74
| March 25
| Philadelphia
|  
|  
|  
|  
| Footprint Center 
| 
|-
| 75
| March 27
| @ Utah
|  
|  
|  
|  
| Vivint Arena 
| 
|-
| 76
| March 29
| Minnesota
|  
|  
|  
|  
| Footprint Center 
| 
|-
| 77
| March 31
| Denver
|  
|  
|  
|  
| Footprint Center 
| 
|-

Transactions

Trades

Free agency

Re-signed

Additions

Subtractions

References

Phoenix
Phoenix Suns seasons
Phoenix Suns
Phoenix Suns
2020s in Arizona